Carl Christensen (born July 5, 1956 in Jackson, Michigan) is a retired American soccer defender who played in the North American Soccer League and Major Indoor Soccer League.

Player
Christensen graduated from Essex High School in Vermont. He then attended the University of Vermont, where he was a 1976 First Team All American soccer player. He was inducted into the University of Vermont Athletic Hall of Fame in 1988. In 1978, he signed with the Dallas Tornado of the North American Soccer League.  He played no games for them before being traded to the San Jose Earthquakes where he finished the season, then played the 1979 season. In the fall of 1979, Christensen signed with the Wichita Wings of the Major Indoor Soccer League.

Coach
Christensen served as an assistant coach to the University of Vermont soccer team in 1981 and 1982.  In 1983, he became the head coach of the Tufts University soccer team.  He coached the team for seven seasons and compiled a 97–28–5 record.

Awards and honors
In December 1999, Sports Illustrated named Christensen number twenty-eight on its list of the top 50 athletes from Vermont. Christensen was inducted into the Vermont Sports Hall of Fame in 2015.

Family
Christensen now lives in New Hampshire with his wife, Lori. He has two sons, Sam and Daniel, and a daughter,  Jenna, whom he loves dearly,.

References

External links
 NASL/MISL stats
 Vermont Sports Hall of Fame Bio

1956 births
Living people
American soccer coaches
American soccer players
Dallas Tornado players
North American Soccer League (1968–1984) players
Major Indoor Soccer League (1978–1992) players
San Jose Earthquakes (1974–1988) players
Vermont Catamounts men's soccer players
Soccer players from Vermont
Wichita Wings (MISL) players
Soccer players from Michigan
People from Jackson, Michigan
Soccer coaches from Michigan
Soccer coaches from Vermont
All-American men's college soccer players
Association football defenders